The Ven. Herbert Crump (1849-1924) was Archdeacon of Stoke from 1905 to 1908.

Crump was educated at St Edmund's School, Canterbury and Jesus College, Cambridge. He was ordained in 1879
and began his career with a curacy in Smethwick. He was then Vicar of Holy Trinity, in that town from 1884 to 1892; then Rector of Stoke-on-Trent from 1892 to 1897; Vicar of Longdon from 1898 to 1905;  and Prebendary of Lichfield from 1901 to 1912.

He died on 12 June 1924.

References

1849 births
People educated at St Edmund's School Canterbury
19th-century English Anglican priests
20th-century English Anglican priests
1924 deaths
Alumni of Jesus College, Oxford
Archdeacons of Stoke